Anthem for the Underdog is the third studio album by the American rock band 12 Stones. It was released on August 14, 2007. The first single "Lie to Me", was made available on 12 Stones' MySpace and official website along with the second single "Anthem For The Underdog", which was used in the movie Never Back Down. Both singles charted in the top 30 on the Mainstream Rock Tracks chart, while "It Was You" charted in the top 10 on Christian Rock charts. The third single, "Adrenaline", was the theme song for the Met-Rx World's Strongest Man competition in 2007. Anthem for the Underdog debuted at No. 53 on the Billboard 200, and stayed on the chart for four weeks.

Track listing

Charts
Album

Singles

References

External links
 "Lie To Me" mp3 on 12stones.com

12 Stones albums
2007 albums
Wind-up Records albums